Mike Buttress (born 5 March 1958) is an English former footballer who played in the Football League for Aston Villa and Gillingham.

References

English footballers
English Football League players
1958 births
Living people
Aston Villa F.C. players
Gillingham F.C. players
Telford United F.C. players
Association football defenders